The 12489 / 90 Bikaner–Dadar Western Superfast Express is a Superfast Express train belonging to Indian Railways – North Western Railway zone that runs between Bikaner Junction and  in India.

It operates as train number 12489 from Bikaner Junction to Dadar Western and as train number 12490 in the reverse direction serving the states of Rajasthan, Gujarat & Maharashtra.

Coaches

The 12489 / 90 Bikaner–Dadar Western Superfast Express presently has 1 AC 2 tier, 6 AC 3 tier, 10 Sleeper Class, 4 Second Class seating & 2 SLR (Seating cum Luggage Rake) coaches. It does not have a pantry car.

As with most train services in India, coach composition may be amended at the discretion of Indian Railways depending on demand.

Service

12489 Bikaner–Dadar Western Superfast Express covers the distance of 1245 kilometres in 22 hours 10 mins (56.17 km/hr).

12490 Dadar Western–Bikaner Superfast Express covers the distance of 1245 kilometres in 22 hours 35 mins (55.13 km/hr).

As the average speed of the train is above 55 km/hr, as per Indian Railways rules, its fare includes a Superfast surcharge.

Routeing

The 12489 / 90 Bikaner–Dadar Western Superfast Express runs via Jodhpur Junction, Ahmedabad Junction, Vadodara Junction to Dadar Western.

It reverses direction twice during its run at Bhildi & .

Traction

As the route is partly electrified, it is hauled from Bikaner Junction by an Abu Road-based WDM-3A locomotive until Ahmedabad Junction handing over to a Vadodara-based WAP-4 or WAP-5 locomotive which powers the train for the remainder of the journey.

Timings

12489 Bikaner–Dadar Western Superfast Express leaves Bikaner Junction every Tuesday & Saturday at 13:50 hrs IST and reaches Dadar at 12:00 hrs IST the next day.

12490 Dadar Western–Bikaner Superfast Express leaves Dadar every Wednesday & Sunday at 14:35 hrs IST and reaches Bikaner Junction at 13:10 hrs IST the next day.

External links

References 

Transport in Bikaner
Transport in Mumbai
Express trains in India
Rail transport in Rajasthan
Rail transport in Gujarat
Rail transport in Maharashtra